Mecyclothorax pele is a species of ground beetle in the subfamily Psydrinae. It was described by Blackburn in 1879.

References

pele
Beetles described in 1879